Kaya Alp was, according to Ottoman tradition, the son of Kızıl Buğa or Basuk and the father of Suleyman Shah. He was the grandfather of Ertuğrul Ghazi, the father of the founder of the Ottoman Empire, Osman I. He was also famously known for being the successing name of Ertokus Bey’s son Kaya Alp. He was a descendant of the ancestor of his tribe, Kayı son of Gun son of Oghuz Khagan, the legendary progenitor of the Oghuz Turks.

References

1214 deaths
13th-century people from the Ottoman Empire
Ottoman dynasty
Year of birth unknown
Year of birth uncertain
Oghuz Turks